The Catholic Total Abstinence Union of America was a Roman Catholic temperance organization active in the 19th and 20th centuries. The work of Father Mathew in promoting temperance across the U.S. led to the establishment of numerous separate and independent Catholic temperance groups. The Catholic temperance societies of Connecticut created a state union in 1871, from which a national union was formed the following year at a convention in Baltimore, Maryland. 177 such societies from 10 states and the District of Columbia, representing a total of 26,481 members, created the Catholic Total Abstinence Union of America. In total, over 500,000 Roman Catholics made the temperance of the Catholic Total Abstinence Union of America.

The Union included women's and juvenile societies as well as the Priest's Total Abstinence League. Its monthly publication was The C.T.A.U. Advocate. The Reverend Thomas J. Conaty, then the president of the Catholic Total Abstinence Union of America, advocated for teetotalism in the May 1887 edition of Catholic World: 

With regard to the issue of National Prohibition, the Catholic Total Abstinence Union passed a resolution in the 1870s resolving "That this convention, though not deeming it expedient to take part in any political of legislative action in reference to prohibitory liquor laws, recognizes, however, the great good that would accrue from the suppression of public drinking-places, and from such legislation as would restrain the manufacture of intoxicating liquors within the bounds consistent with public morality, and will gladly hail such legislation whenever the proper authorities may grant it."

The Plenary Councils of Baltimore declared:

Pope Leo XIII, on 27 March 1887, commended the work of the temperance movement, especially the Catholic Total Abstinence Union, "esteem[ing] worthy of all commendation the noble resolve of your pious associations, by which they pledge themselves to abstain totally from every kind of intoxicating drinks." 

President Theodore Roosevelt positively cited the work of the Union in an August 1905 address.

See also 

Pioneer Total Abstinence Association
Catholic Total Abstinence Union Fountain
List of Temperance organizations

References

External links
 History of the Catholic Total Abstinence Union of America
 Temperance Movements

Temperance organizations in the United States
Religious organizations established in 1872
1872 establishments in the United States
Christian temperance movement